The Tick Canyon Formation (Tt) or Tick Canyon strata, is an Early Miocene geologic formation in the Sierra Pelona Ridge of the San Gabriel Mountains in Los Angeles County, California.

The Tick Canyon Basin drains into the Santa Clara River.

Geology 
The formation overlies the Oligocene to Lower Miocene Vasquez Formation, and underlies the Upper Miocene Mint Canyon Formation.

The Tick Canyon strata was deposited on land mostly by streams and consists of green sandstones, coarse-grained conglomerates, and red claystones. The Tick Canyon strata also contain abundant volcanic clasts, most of which resemble volcanic rocks of the Vasquez Formation.

North of the Tick Canyon Fault, the beds are almost vertical.

Fossil content 
It preserves vertebrate fossils of the Lower Miocene subperiod of the Miocene epoch, in the Neogene Period of the Cenozoic Era.

Mammals 
 Artiodactyls
 Miolabis californicus
 Merychyus calaminthus
 M. minimus
 Perissodactyls
 Parahippus maxsoni
 Parahippus sp.
 Rodents
 Archaeolagus acaricolus
 Trogomys rupinimenthae

Birds 
 Falconiformes
 Miohierax stocki

See also 

 List of fossiliferous stratigraphic units in California
 Paleontology in California
 Goliad Formation
 Plush Ranch Formation
 Punchbowl Formation
 Shoal River Formation

References

Bibliography

Further reading 
 Geology of Tick Canyon, by Ygnacio Bonillas, 1933
 Geology of the Upper Tick Canyon Area, by Albert Hedden, 1948
 Geology of the Upper Tick Canyon Area, by Joseph Birman, 1950
 Geology of the Upper Tick Canyon Area, by Carel Otte, Jr., 1950

Geologic formations of California
Miocene California
Miocene Series of North America
Burdigalian
Barstovian
Hemingfordian
Sandstone formations of the United States
Shale formations of the United States
Conglomerate formations
Fluvial deposits
Paleontology in California
Geology of Los Angeles County, California
Sierra Pelona Ridge